Night Ark is an instrumental quartet formed in 1986. The members are American-Armenian Ara Dinkjian, Turkish Armenian Arto Tunçboyacıyan, American-Armenian Armen Donelian and American Marc Johnson.  The quartet's most famous piece is the instrumental "Homecoming".  Another famous variation on the piece is Dinata, which is set to Greek lyrics, first sung by Eleftheria Arvanitaki. Homecoming was also the theme for the satirical Israeli television series HaHamishiya HaKamerit ("The Chamber Quintet"). 

On November 2010 the Night Ark have performed a reunion show in the Jerusalem Oud Festival.

Discography
 1986 - Picture, RCA/Novus
 1988 - Moments, RCA/Novus
 1998 - In Wonderland, PolyGram
 2000 - Petals on your Path, EmArcy
 2000 - Treasures [Compilation], Traditional Crossroads

References

American instrumental musical groups
Armenian musical groups
Turkish musical groups